Mushroom Island in the Antarctic is an ice-covered island lying  west-southwest of Cape Berteaux, off the west coast of Graham Land.

It was first charted by the British Graham Land Expedition (BGLE) under Rymill, 1934–37, and so named because of its resemblance to a mushroom cap.

See also 
 List of Antarctic and sub-Antarctic islands

References
 

Islands of Graham Land
Fallières Coast